Mario Ančić and Ivan Dodig were the defending champions, but decided not to participate.
Colombian players Juan Sebastián Cabal and Robert Farah defeated Santiago González and Travis Rettenmaier 2–6, 6–3, [11–9] in the final.

Seeds

Draw

Draw

References
 Main Draw

Roma Open - Doubles
2011 Doubles